Hillcrest is a suburb in southeastern Hamilton in New Zealand. The suburb is home to the University of Waikato and consequently has a large student population. It is located on the east side of the Hamilton Town Belt, a series of public parks that run from the Hamilton Gardens to Ruakura in its eastern section.

History
The area was formerly known as Steele's Hill, named after Capt. W. Steele. Much of it was covered in orchards in the early 1900s. It was named Hillcrest by the Waikato County Council in the 1940s when the area began developing as a suburb. Hillcrest became a part of Hamilton in 1949, with the 5th boundary extension. Significant development took place throughout the 1950s and 1960s.

Notable locations

The University of Waikato

The main campus of the University of Waikato was established in 1964. In 2010, the university had 13,089 students enrolled, the majority based at the Hillcrest campus.

Academy of Performing Arts
Opened in 2001, the Academy of Performing Arts is a prominent music and theatre venue in Hamilton. Its concert chamber is one of Hamilton's premier classical music venues.

Former Hamilton Railway Station
The Station on Hillcrest Road is the former main railway station for Hamilton. The building was relocated from Victoria Street to its current Hillcrest location in the 1960s, when the Hamilton Central underground train station was built. It is one of the few surviving railway stations that were built during the time that Julius Vogel was in charge of New Zealand's Public Works Department.

Demographics

Hillcrest had a population of 5,760 at the 2018 New Zealand census, an increase of 378 people (7.0%) since the 2013 census, and an increase of 627 people (12.2%) since the 2006 census. There were 1,803 households, comprising 2,874 males and 2,889 females, giving a sex ratio of 0.99 males per female, with 1,056 people (18.3%) aged under 15 years, 2,061 (35.8%) aged 15 to 29, 2,190 (38.0%) aged 30 to 64, and 459 (8.0%) aged 65 or older.

Ethnicities were 59.5% European/Pākehā, 16.9% Māori, 6.1% Pacific peoples, 26.2% Asian, and 4.7% other. People may identify with more than one ethnicity.

The percentage of people born overseas was 37.2, compared with 27.1% nationally.

Although some people chose not to answer the census question about religious affiliation, 48.1% had no religion, 34.0% were Christian, 1.2% had Māori religious beliefs, 2.5% were Hindu, 3.2% were Muslim, 3.1% were Buddhist, and 3.3% had other religions.

Of those at least 15 years old, 1,599 (34.0%) people had a bachelor's or higher degree, and 432 (9.2%) people had no formal qualifications. 570 people (12.1%) earned over $70,000, compared to 17.2% nationally. The employment status of those at least 15 was that 2,085 (44.3%) were employed full-time, 795 (16.9%) part-time, and 300 (6.4%) were unemployed.

The 2013 Index of  Socioeconomic Deprivation, ranked 1-10 from lowest to most deprived areas, lists the University section of Hillcrest at 8/10 (high deprivation) and the Hillcrest West section at 6/10 (moderate deprivation).

Education
Hillcrest Normal opened in 1923, and Knighton Normal opened in 1957. The term "Normal" comes from the French term école normale and means these schools assist in the training of teachers.

Rolls are as of 

Despite the name, Hillcrest High School is actually located in the neighbouring suburb of Silverdale.

See also
 List of streets in Hamilton
 Suburbs of Hamilton, New Zealand

References

External links

Suburbs of Hamilton, New Zealand